The Reymann Brewing Company of Wheeling, West Virginia was the state's largest and most successful pre-Prohibition brewery. 

It began as the P.P. Beck Brewery in 1847. Beck formed a partnership with A. Reymann which continued until 1863 when Reymann gained full ownership. 

A small sales book lists the Reymann depots in several cities in Ohio, West Virginia, and Pennsylvania, including Charleston, Huntington, Canton, Marietta, Pittsburgh, and Erie. In the 1890s, one cold storage room and saloon operated by Reymann Brewing was on land rented to the company by President William McKinley and his wife. The brewery produced as much as 28,000 barrels of beer in the early teens. 

The Reymann company's bottling department employees worked with engineers from the Studebaker Corporation to design a beer truck. The truck proved so successful that it was featured in an early edition of the Western Brewer [an industry publication].

See also
List of historic sites in Ohio County, West Virginia
List of defunct breweries in the United States

Further reading
Reymann Brewing Company at Abandoned

References

Companies based in Wheeling, West Virginia
Defunct brewery companies of the United States
Brewery buildings in the United States